Conception is a Norwegian power/progressive metal band from Raufoss, originally active from 1989 to 1997, during which they released four studio albums. The band reunited in 2018, twenty years after originally disbanding with a new single and EP.

History
The band began when guitarist Tore Østby joined three local musicians, who were playing covers of metal bands for their own enjoyment. Tore ended up getting ambitions of beginning his own work and started writing original material. Around the same time, the band acquired Dag Østby as their vocalist and the band named themselves "Redrum". The band was active for only a few months before the three local members left abruptly. Tore and Dag recruited Werner Skogli as the band's drummer as well as Tranberg alumnus Freddy Samsonstuen for bass guitar. With a fresh new line-up, Tore chose the band's name "Conception", for which their first rehearsal on 5 November 1989 began the foundation of the band, continuing to practice and refine their sound.

The following year, the band hired engineer Nils Harald Mæhlum to record their first demo which had a strong base in thrash metal. Not long after the band recorded their first demo tape, Werner left the band and Nils Harald Mæhlum suggested Arve Heimdal who jammed with Tore after a listen to the demo and become the band's drummer. After recording a second demo with the same producer, Freddy Samsonstuen left the band, and Ingar Amlien was hired as the band's bassist following a jam session with Østby and Heimdal. The band continued rehearsing, occasionally performing to small audiences in Dag's garden to overcome the band's stage fright. The band performed publicly for the first time on 22 December 1990 at the Sentrum Kino in Dokka as part of a local festival titled "MEGAROCK", in which they were noted as the best performers that evening, resulting in more shows from the band soon following.

Following successful performances, the band prepared to record a single to release. Tore began to experiment in other types of music which in turn began to alter the band's direction of music to a melodic, progressive style, which in turn from the demands, made it clear that the band wanted a different singer. With the new music direction the band wanted to take, Dag Østby quit, and the band began auditioning new singers, eventually settling on Roy Khan, a classically trained opera singer from Elverum. The band had already recorded a lot of material from their first album, The Last Sunset. Following rehearsals, the band returned to the studio to finish the album with vocal recording and recording the title track of the album. Hans Christian Gjestvang was hired by the band to record the keyboards. When the album was finished, they established their own independent record label "Conception Self-Financed".

Following its 1991 release, the title track entered at number three on the Norsktoppen charts in 1992 for three weeks, as well as the album having receiving praise from European reviewers. In 1992, the band recorded a song titled "Black on Black" for a compilation CD of Norway's metal scene. The band was later discovered and signed by German label Noise Records in 1993, where they recorded their second album Parallel Minds, released the same year. The following year Noise also reissued their debut album. In 1995, the band released their third album, In Your Multitude and their fourth album, Flow, in 1997.

The band was characterized by a unique sound in the power/progressive metal genre, notable for Østby's occasional integration of elements of flamenco (which he would continue in his later work with Ark) and Khan's unique, operatic vocals.

Breakup and reunion
Conception disbanded in 1997, and after that Roy Khan was invited to join American symphonic power metal band Kamelot as their new lead singer. He went on to release several albums with the band, before departing in 2010 due to health issues, and retiring from music indefinitely. Østby devoted his focus to Ark, a progressive metal band he had formed in 1999 along with Jørn Lande and John Macaluso. They disbanded in 2002 and reunited from 2009 to 2011. Ingar Amlien formed the death metal band Crest of Darkness, who have released six studio albums as of 2018, and remain active. Drummer Arve Heimdal retired from music in 1999, making a one-off return for the band's 2005 reunion.

Conception reunited in 2005, playing the important American prog metal festival ProgPower USA on 16 September and Norwegian Scream Magazines 15 Years & 100 Issues Festival on 1 October, bringing the final five-man line-up together again.

Return to music
In April 2018, rumours began circulating that the band were planning a comeback, after reports of rehearsals in Gjøvik, followed by fan photos of the band together. Just a few days earlier, lead singer Roy Khan had posted a new track to his personal YouTube channel, his first known recording since 2010. This track, however, had no connection to Conception.

A few weeks later, the band officially confirmed their reunion via their official Facebook site, and announced the recording of a brand new EP titled My Dark Symphony which was released on 23 November 2018. The reunion included the classic four-piece line-up, with Heimdal and Khan both coming out of retirement. Following the release of the EP, the band performed two reunion shows in Gjøvik, Norway in late April, before setting out to perform at three European festivals over the summer of 2019.

On 20 February 2020 the band announced their fifth studio album State of Deception, which was released on 3 April 2020. The first single off of the album, "Waywardly Broken" was released on 6 March 2020, along with an accompanied lyric video. The band released a music video for their song "No Rewind" on 22 May 2021. On June 6, 2021, the band announced that they would be releasing an expanded edition of State of Deception in 2022, featuring live tracks, re-recordings and new songs. They also announced the release of the single, "Cry", which was recorded live. On February 5, 2022, Conception released "Monument in Time", a song which will be featured on the deluxe edition of State of Deception.

The band had originally announced on 1 July 2019 that they would be embarking upon their first European headline tour in twenty-three years in April of the same year the new album was released. Due to the COVID-19 pandemic, the band had postponed the tour into 2022. After the European tour, Conception had performed an exclusive North American show at ProgPower USA XXI in June 2022. On 9 September 2022, the band reissued their first four albums.

Line-up

Current members
 Tore Østby – guitars (1989–1998, 2005, 2018–present), keyboards (1989–1992, 1995–1996, 2018–present), lead vocals (1990–1991)
 Roy Khan – lead vocals (1991–1998, 2005, 2018–present)
 Ingar Amlien – bass (1990–1998, 2005, 2018–present)
 Arve Heimdal – drums (1990–1998, 2005, 2018–present)

Former members
 Freddy Samsonstuen – bass, keyboards (1989–1990)
 Werner Skogli – drums (1989–1990)
 Dag Østby – lead vocals (1989–1991)
 Hans Christian Gjestvang – keyboards (1992–1994)
 Halvor Holter – keyboards (1994)
 Trond Nagell-Dahl – keyboards (1994–1995, 1996–1998, 2005)

Former live musicians
 Lars Christian Narum – keyboards (1996)

Timeline

Discography

Studio albums
 The Last Sunset (1991)
 Parallel Minds (1993)
 In Your Multitude (1995)
 Flow (1997)
 State of Deception (2020)

References

External links
 Official Conception website
Official Conception Facebook Page
 Official Conception Instagram
 Official Conception Twitter

Norwegian progressive metal musical groups
Norwegian power metal musical groups
Musical groups established in 1989
1989 establishments in Norway
Musical groups disestablished in 1998
1998 disestablishments in Norway
Musical groups reestablished in 2005
Musical groups reestablished in 2018
Musical quintets
Musical groups from Oppland
Noise Records artists